Lawrence D. Kinnebrew (born June 11, 1960 in Rome, Georgia) is a former professional American football player who was selected by the Cincinnati Bengals in the sixth round of the 1983 NFL Draft. A 6' 1", 258-pound running back from Tennessee State University, Kinnebrew played in 7 NFL seasons from 1983-1987 with the Bengals and 1989-1990 with the Buffalo Bills.

On October 28, 1984, Kinnebrew set a Bengals record by scoring four rushing touchdowns in a game against the Houston Oilers.  His best full season was 1985, when he gained 714 yards on 170 carries, scored 9 rushing touchdowns, and had 22 pass receptions.

Sources

Debra Dennis, Kinnebrew Rape Case Dismissed, Cincinnati Post, August 31, 1993 (retrieved at westlaw.com).

1960 births
Living people
Sportspeople from Rome, Georgia
American football running backs
Tennessee State Tigers football players
Cincinnati Bengals players
Buffalo Bills players